Lessie is an unincorporated community in Nassau County, Florida, United States. It is located near the center of the county.

A post office called Lessie was established in 1899, and closed in 1908.

Geography
Lessie is located at  (30.725, -81.7772).

References

Unincorporated communities in Nassau County, Florida
Unincorporated communities in the Jacksonville metropolitan area
Unincorporated communities in Florida